Gastrotheca coeruleomaculatus is a species of frog in the family Hemiphractidae. It is endemic to Bolivia. Its natural habitat is subtropical or tropical moist montane forests. It is threatened by habitat loss.

References

Gastrotheca
Amphibians of Bolivia
Amphibians of the Andes
Endemic fauna of Bolivia
Taxonomy articles created by Polbot
Taxobox binomials not recognized by IUCN